The Xuchang East railway station (Chinese: 许昌东站) is a railway station of the Beijing–Guangzhou–Shenzhen–Hong Kong High-Speed Railway located in east area of Xuchang, Henan, China.

Metro station
It will be served by Zhengxu Line in 2022.

References

Railway stations in Henan
Stations on the Shijiazhuang–Wuhan High-Speed Railway
Railway stations in China opened in 2012